Michael English (born 2 May 1995) is a Scottish cricketer. In June 2019, he was selected to represent Scotland A in their tour to Ireland to play the Ireland Wolves. He made his List A debut for Scotland A against the Ireland Wolves on 5 June 2019. Prior to his List A debut, he was named in Scotland's squad for the 2014 Under-19 Cricket World Cup.

References

External links
 

1995 births
Living people
Scottish cricketers
Bedfordshire cricketers
Sportspeople from Paisley, Renfrewshire